Richard Dunn may refer to:

Richard Dunn (politician) (1905–1988), American politician from Maine
Dick Dunn (boxer) (1908–2001), New Zealand boxing coach
Richard Dunn (footballer) (1919–1985), English footballer
Dick Dunn (rugby league) (1920–2006), Australian rugby league footballer
Richard B. Dunn (1927–2005), American solar physicist and astronomer
Richard Slator Dunn (1928–2022), American historian
Richard Dunn (actor) (1936–2010), American actor, regular cast member of Tim and Eric Awesome Show, Great Job!
Richard Dunn (television executive) (1943–1998), English television executive and Thames Television CEO from 1985 to 1995
Richard Dunn (boxer) (born 1945), English boxer
Richie Dunn (1957–2016), American ice hockey player

See also 
Richard Dunne (born 1979), Irish footballer